Robert Bakewell may refer to:

 Robert Bakewell (agriculturalist) (1725–1795), pioneering English farmer
 Robert Bakewell (ironsmith) (1682–1752), English wrought ironsmith
 Robert Bakewell (geologist) (1768–1843), English geologist